Street art in Adelaide is a growing aspect of the wider public arts scene found in the Adelaide central business district. Adelaide street art includes the full gamut of contemporary street art mediums, including stenciling, murals, paste-ups, sticker art and yarn bombing.

Whereas Adelaide street art was previously painted over on occasion by the local authorities, street art in Adelaide is now recognised and cultivated by state and local governments through supportive policies, as well as events such as the Oi You! Urban Art Festival.

Street art locations 
Adelaide's street art scene is physically centred in the Adelaide central business district, though it can be found in the suburbs. Stencils and other forms of street art such as yarn bombing also appears throughout suburbia and along public transport routes.

Major locations for street art in the city include lane ways off of Rundle Street, Hindley Street, Ebenezer Place and under the Morphett Street Bridge. Access to the Topham Mall has been banned by the Adelaide City Council.

See also 
 Street art
 List of Australian street artists

Street artists from Adelaide:
 James Cochran (artist)
 Dlux (street artist)

Other Australian cities:
 Street art in Melbourne
 Newtown area graffiti and street art, Sydney

References

External links 
 Adelaide City Council's public art page
  From the street, Art Gallery of South Australia, Adelaide street art exhibition
 Adelaide Street Art (Photo Gallery)
 Who Owns The Street?, Sheffield Doc/Fest, Adelaide documentary exploring questions of ownership and public property, art and vandalism surrounding street art
 Ebenezer Place Street Art
 Facebook - Adelaide Street Art
 Ten top Australian street artists
 Tumblr - Adelaide Graffiti & Street Art

Street art in Australia
Arts in Adelaide
Public art in Adelaide